Dekteri is a rural locality (a village) in Kubenskoye Rural Settlement, Vologodsky District, Vologda Oblast, Russia. The population was 25 as of 2002. There are 2 streets.

Geography 
Dekteri is located 72 km northwest of Vologda (the district's administrative centre) by road. Kunovo is the nearest rural locality.

References 

Rural localities in Vologodsky District